David Houser House, also known as Oak Grove, is a historic home located near St. Matthews, Calhoun County, South Carolina. It was built in 1829, and is a two-story, rectangular wood frame I-house with a gable roof and stuccoed brick chimney.  It has a one-story front porch and rear addition. Also on the property are the original smokehouse, a part of the 19th century Dutch oven, a frame building believed to have once been bedrooms attached to the rear of the house, a barn, a servant's house, a workshop, and the family cemetery where David Houser is buried.

It was listed in the National Register of Historic Places in 1980.

References

Houses on the National Register of Historic Places in South Carolina
Houses completed in 1829
Houses in Calhoun County, South Carolina
National Register of Historic Places in Calhoun County, South Carolina